Joseph Neal Devine (born September 19, 1983) is an American former professional baseball pitcher. He played in Major League Baseball (MLB) for the Atlanta Braves and Oakland Athletics.

Baseball career

Atlanta Braves
Devine was the Braves' first selection (27th overall) in the first round of the 2005 Major League Baseball draft out of North Carolina State University, where he had set the Wolfpack record for saves with 24 and made the All-Atlantic Coast Conference team three times. After being drafted, Devine spent only two months in the minor leagues, pitching with the Single-A Advanced Myrtle Beach Pelicans and the Double-A Mississippi Braves, before being called up to the major leagues on August 20. He was the first player in his draft class to make his MLB debut.

Devine encountered early struggles once being called up to the major leagues, becoming the first pitcher in major league history to allow a grand slam in each of his first two games. Braves manager Bobby Cox showed faith in Devine, however, by including him on the postseason roster despite his pitching only five innings with the big-league club during the regular season. In the 18th inning of Game 4 of the 2005 National League Division Series, Devine gave up a walk-off home run to Houston Astros rookie Chris Burke to end the Braves' season.

In , Atlanta planned to have Devine start the season at Triple-A Richmond as the closer, but injuries to Horacio Ramírez and Blaine Boyer forced the Braves to call him up along with fellow reliever Ken Ray. Devine struggled once again, however, pitching a total of one inning in two games against the San Francisco Giants and giving up seven runs on five hits, five walks, and two wild pitches. Devine was optioned back to Richmond afterwards, with Peter Moylan serving as his replacement in Atlanta's bullpen. Devine was called up again in September and continued to pitch in Atlanta until the end of the regular season.  Baseball America rated Devine as the Braves' ninth-best prospect entering . Devine spent the majority of the 2007 season at Mississippi, though he was called up by Atlanta several times. On September 22, Devine earned his first major league victory against the Milwaukee Brewers. He finished the 2007 season 1–0 with a 1.08 ERA.

Oakland Athletics
On January 14, Devine was traded to the Oakland Athletics along with minor league pitcher Jamie Richmond for center fielder Mark Kotsay. This record is not officially recognized because the MLB minimum is 50 innings.

Devine missed the 2009 season following Tommy John surgery on his right elbow. The operation was performed Tuesday, April 21, 2009, by Dr. James Andrews on Devine's ulnar collateral ligament. On December 2, 2009, Devine, avoided arbitration and agreed to a 1-year contract with the Oakland Athletics.

Devine remained inactive through the 2010 season while still recovering from the surgery. He finally returned to action in 2011. However, after struggling to find control in a flukish spring training game, Joey Devine was sent down to the A's Minor League Sacramento River Cats to work out the kinks. He instantly regained his 2008 form and commenced to not allow a single earned run over his first 12 innings, striking out a solid 17, giving up only 4 hits, and walking a mere one batter. He was recalled to the Oakland A's Major League Roster on May, 20th 2011.

Devines' longest streak of innings without yielding an earned run (33.2 innings) was broken on June 3, 2011, due to inherited runs acquired through reliever Brian Fuentes.

After pitching relatively well after his return to the MLB roster in 2011, Devine struggled in late July during his last three outings of that month (Devine attributed control issues to heat and lack of grip during a heat wave in which temps. were over ). On July 22, 2011, he walked three consecutive Yankees, throwing a wild pitch behind Brandon Laird to initiate the latter's debut major-league at-bat. His control issues lead to his being demoted back to Sacramento River Cats on July 28, 2011, despite the fact that many of the earned runs he had acquired to that point were inherited after he stepped off the mound. Prior to his last three outings, Devine was one of the leading pitchers on Oakland's MLB pitching staff statistically: 2.14 ERA and declining, over 9K/9 innings, and high octane pitch speeds of up to 97 MPH, with additional nasty off speed pitch movement in his slider, low hits/outs ratio, hitters average under .200, no homers allowed, and an average walk rate.

It was announced on April 10, 2012, that Devine had undergone his second career Tommy John surgery. Devine was placed on the disabled list for the 2012 season.

Personal life
After leaving baseball, Devine worked for a sports agency, earned a degree from NC State while living in Raleigh, North Carolina and worked as a graduate assistant for the his former college team.

In 2017, Devine told The Atlanta Journal-Constitution that Brian McCann was still one of his closest friends.

, he was married and had three young children.

References

External links

Joey Devine Interview at Baseball Digest Daily

1983 births
Living people
People from Junction City, Kansas
Baseball players from Kansas
Major League Baseball pitchers
Atlanta Braves players
Oakland Athletics players
NC State Wolfpack baseball players
Myrtle Beach Pelicans players
Mississippi Braves players
Richmond Braves players
Sacramento River Cats players
Peoria Javelinas players